Zani i Ri (New Voice) was a fortnightly newspaper published in Albania from August 1920 by Osman Myderrizi, a member of the first Parliament of Albania and the 1924–1925 Constitutional Convention. It was the first newspaper to be published in Tirana after it had been made capital of Albania.

References

Defunct newspapers published in Albania
Mass media in Tirana
1920 establishments in Albania